Sámi magasiidna (English translation: Sámi magazine, styled SÁMi magasiidna) is a Sámi periodical that has been published weekly by iSÁMi.Press in Kárášjohka since 2017. It is published in Northern Sámi, Southern Sámi and Norwegian. During 2018 and 2019 the periodical was called Sámi ođasmagasiidna (Sámi news magazine). In 2020, it merged with the Norwegian-language Sett nordfra to form Sámi magasiidna – Sett nordfra.

Editors
 Jan Skoglund Paltto (2017)
 Anne Rasmus (2018)
 Anne Berit Anti (2018 – 2019)
 Anne Rasmus (2020 – )

References

2017 establishments in Norway
2020 disestablishments in Norway
Defunct magazines published in Norway
Magazines established in 2017
Magazines disestablished in 2020
Multilingual magazines
News magazines published in Europe
Northern Sámi-language magazines
Sámi in Norway
Sámi magazines
Weekly magazines published in Norway